The 2014 USAC Traxxas Silver Crown Champ Car Series season was the 43rd season of the USAC Silver Crown Series. The series began with the Sumar Classic at the Terre Haute Action Track on April 6, and ended on October 11 at New York State Fairgrounds. Bobby East began the season as the defending champion, and Kody Swanson was the season champion.

Schedule/Results

Teams/Drivers

References

USAC Silver Crown Series
United States Auto Club